Lami is a neighbourhood (bairro) in the city of Porto Alegre, the state capital of Rio Grande do Sul, in Brazil. It was created by Law 6893 from September 12, 1991.

Lami is home to the Lami José Lutzenberger Biological Reserve, founded in 1975.

In 2000, there were 3,493 people living here. Many of them are fishermen.

Neighbourhoods in Porto Alegre